WWE World Title may refer to one of Seven World Heavyweight championships contested in the professional wrestling promotion WWE.

WWF Martial Arts Heavyweight Championship (established December 18, 1978)
WCW Championship (established March 23, 2001)
ECW Championship (established June 13, 2006)
World Heavyweight Championship (WWE) (established September 2, 2002)
NXT Championship (established July 1, 2012)
WWE Championship (established April 29, 1963)
WWE Universal Championship (established July 25, 2016)